Folly of Love (German: Unfug der Liebe) is a 1928 German silent comedy film directed by Robert Wiene and starring Maria Jacobini, Jack Trevor and Betty Astor. While several of Wiene's previous films had met with mixed responses, Folly of Love was universally praised by critics. The film was made at the Marienfelde Studios of Terra Film. It was Wiene's last silent film. His next work was the 1930 sound film The Other.

Cast
  Maria Jacobini   
  Jack Trevor 
 Betty Astor    
  Angelo Ferrari    
  Ferry Silka 
  Oreste Bilancia   
  Willi Forst
  Reza Sarijlou
  Dan Gillen

References

Bibliography
 Jung, Uli & Schatzberg, Walter. Beyond Caligari: The Films of Robert Wiene. Berghahn Books, 1999.

External links

Films of the Weimar Republic
1928 films
German silent feature films
German comedy films
Films directed by Robert Wiene
Films based on Swiss novels
1928 comedy films
Terra Film films
German black-and-white films
Silent comedy films
Films shot at Terra Studios
1920s German films
1920s German-language films